John Dewar Denniston (4 March 1887 in India – 2 May 1949 in Church Stretton) was a British classical scholar.

His parents were James Lawson Denniston, of the Indian Civil Service, and Agnes Guthrie. He was educated at Winchester College and New College, Oxford. He took a First in Classical Moderations (Greek and Latin) in 1908 and a Second in Literae Humaniores (philosophy and ancient history) in 1910. He was Fellow of Hertford College, Oxford, from 1913 until his death.

He served in the First World War, 1914–18, 7th King's Own Scottish Borderers and General Staff War Office. He was twice wounded; he gained the distinctions of Croix de Guerre and O.B.E.

Publications

Greek Literary Criticism (1924)
Cicero Philippics I and II (1925)
The Greek Particles (1934)
Euripides' Electra (1939)
Oxford Classical Dictionary co-editor, (1949)
Greek Prose Style (1952)
Aeschylus' Agamemnon edited with Denys Page, (1957)

References

1887 births
1949 deaths
British classical scholars
Fellows of Hertford College, Oxford
Classical scholars of the University of Oxford
British people in colonial India